"Get Myself Arrested" is a song by Gomez. It appears on their 1998 Mercury Prize-winning album Bring It On. It was released as a single on 1 June 1998, reaching #45 in the UK.

Track listings
"Get Myself Arrested" - 4:05
"Flavours" - 3:11
"Old School Shirt" - 3:30
"The Cowboy Song" - 1:16

Charts

1998 singles
Gomez (band) songs
1997 songs
Hut Records singles
Song recordings produced by Ken Nelson (British record producer)